Sarah Kramer is a Canadian vegan cookbook author. She is the best-selling author of How It All Vegan, The Garden of Vegan, La Dolce Vegan! and Vegan A Go-Go!. In 2012, she released Go Vegan! w/Sarah Kramer, one of the world's first vegan cookbook iPhone/iPad apps. 
Kramer has written for publications such as Herbivore Magazine, Veg News and Shared Vision. She runs a popular vegan website/blog at govegan.net.  She had a small vegan boutique called Sarah's Place that opened in 2011 and closed 2 years later after a diagnosis of breast cancer. Sarah did treatment in 2013 and now works full time at the business Tattoo Zoo that she co-owns with her wife, Geri Kramer in Victoria, BC. Sarah and Geri have a podcast called Meet The Kramers in which they discuss their 25-year marriage in relation to Geri's coming out as a trans woman in 2019.

Books
 How It All Vegan (with Tanya Barnard) (1999) 
 The Garden Of Vegan (with Tanya Barnard) (2003) 
 La Dolce Vegan (2005) 
 Vegan A Go-Go! (2008) 
 How It All Vegan: 10th Anniversary Edition (2009)

Podcast 

 Meet The Kramers podcast

See also
 Vegan
 List of vegans

References

Interviews and articles
 Article in Shared Vision
 Podcast Interview on Vegan Freak Radio
 Interview with The Cookbook Store
 Interview with Abebooks.com

External links
 Meet The Kramers podcast
 Tattoo Zoo
 Sarah's Blog
 GoVegan.net, Sarah's website
 Arsenal Pulp Press, Sarah's publisher

Chefs of vegan cuisine
Canadian women chefs
Canadian food writers
Year of birth missing (living people)
Living people
Writers from Regina, Saskatchewan
Canadian cookbook writers
Vegan cookbook writers